Marc-André Fleury (born November 28, 1984) is a Canadian professional ice hockey goaltender for the Minnesota Wild of the National Hockey League (NHL). Drafted out of the Quebec Major Junior Hockey League (QMJHL) first overall by the Pittsburgh Penguins in the 2003 NHL Entry Draft, Fleury played major junior for four seasons with the Cape Breton Screaming Eagles, earning both the Mike Bossy Trophy as the league's top prospect and the Telus Cup as the top defensive player in 2003. He joined the Penguins in 2003–04 and during his 13 seasons with the team won Stanley Cup championships in 2009, 2016, and 2017. He received the William M. Jennings Trophy and the Vezina Trophy in 2021. He is the third goaltender to ever reach the 500 victories mark in the NHL, after Patrick Roy and Martin Brodeur.

Internationally, Fleury has represented Canada twice as a junior, winning back-to-back silver medals at the World Junior Championships in 2003 and 2004. He won a gold medal with Team Canada at the 2010 Winter Olympics in Vancouver. Fleury is known by the nickname "Flower", derived from the English translation of his last name (fleuri means "in bloom", or "in flower", in French).

Playing career

As a youth, Fleury played in the 1998 Quebec International Pee-Wee Hockey Tournament with the College-Français Rive-Sud minor ice hockey team from South Shore, Montreal.

Fleury played junior ice hockey in the Quebec Major Junior Hockey League for the Cape Breton Screaming Eagles, beginning in 2000–01. After a strong 2002–03 campaign that included a silver medal with Team Canada at the World Junior Championships and QMJHL Second Team All-Star honours, he was chosen first overall in the 2003 NHL Entry Draft by the Pittsburgh Penguins. The Penguins acquired the first overall pick from the Florida Panthers in a trade that sent the first and 73rd overall picks to the Penguins in exchange for Mikael Samuelsson and the third and 55th picks. He is only the third goalie to be chosen first overall in the NHL draft, after Michel Plasse and Rick DiPietro. Playing four seasons total with Cape Breton, Fleury's jersey number 29 was later retired by the club in his fourth NHL season on January 25, 2008.

Pittsburgh Penguins (2003–2017)

2003–04
Fleury immediately made his NHL debut in 2003–04 as the youngest goaltender in the league at 18 years old (three years younger than the second-youngest, Rick DiPietro of the New York Islanders). He appeared in his first NHL game on October 10, 2003, against the Los Angeles Kings, recording an impressive 46-save performance, which included a penalty shot save, in a 3–0 loss. Fleury recorded his first NHL win in his very next start, on October 18, with 31 saves in a 4–3 win over the Detroit Red Wings. His first NHL shutout came on October 30, in a 1–0 victory over the Chicago Blackhawks. Fleury shared time with goaltenders Jean-Sébastien Aubin and Sébastien Caron and lived up to first-overall-pick expectations early, earning Rookie of the Month honours in October with a 2–2–2 record, 1.96 goals against average (GAA) and .943 save percentage. As the season progressed, however, his performance began to sink, mainly due to Pittsburgh's poor defence. The team regularly gave up over 30 shots per game, and rarely managed to become an offensive threat. He was loaned to Team Canada for the 2004 World Junior Championships in December and, upon returning with a second consecutive silver medal, he was sent back to the QMJHL on January 29, 2004. In light of financial difficulties for the franchise, it is believed Fleury's $3 million contract bonus, which he would have potentially received if he stayed and met several performance goals, was a factor in the decision to return him to Cape Breton. To no avail, Fleury offered to forfeit his bonus to remain with the club. Fleury finished the QMJHL season with Cape Breton in a first round elimination and was subsequently assigned to Pittsburgh's American Hockey League (AHL) affiliate, the Wilkes-Barre/Scranton Penguins, and appeared in two post-season games.

2005–06

As NHL play was postponed due to the labour dispute, Fleury continued to play with Wilkes-Barre/Scranton in 2004–05, where he posted a 26–19–4 record, a 2.52 GAA and a .901 save percentage. When NHL play resumed in 2005–06, Fleury started the season once more in the minors, but was quickly called up by Pittsburgh for a game against the Buffalo Sabres on October 10 to replace an injured Jocelyn Thibault. He continued to play between Wilkes-Barre/Scranton and Pittsburgh until November 28, after which he remained with Pittsburgh. With the Penguins finishing last in the Eastern Conference and allowing a league-worst 316 goals, Fleury recorded a 3.25 GAA and a .898 save percentage. Competing for time with Sébastien Caron and Jocelyn Thibault, Fleury emerged as the Penguins' starting goalie.

2006–07
Despite playing behind a shaky defense, Fleury was able to impress the team management with his technique and performance and signed a two-year contract extension worth $2.59 million in the off-season. In the proceeding campaign, Fleury's stats improved significantly. Playing behind a better Penguins team, which featured rising superstars Sidney Crosby and Evgeni Malkin, he recorded five shutouts and a 2.83 GAA. He earned his 40th win in a 2–1 victory over the New York Rangers in the season finale, joining Tom Barrasso as the only Penguins goaltenders to record 40 wins in a season. He also broke Johan Hedberg's single season franchise record for most games and minutes played. Fleury made his NHL playoff debut against the Ottawa Senators, the eventual Stanley Cup finalists, in the first round and recorded his first playoff win in Game 2, recording 34 saves in a 4–3 win at Scotiabank Place.

2007–08
Fleury started the 2007–08 season slowly, then won four straight games before suffering a high-ankle sprain against the Calgary Flames on December 6. He returned as a starter on March 2, after a brief conditioning stint in the AHL with Wilkes-Barre/Scranton. While sidelined, he decided to change the colour of his goaltending equipment from the bright yellow that had become his signature to plain white, to gain an optical advantage over shooters. He was also influenced and challenged by the very strong play of Ty Conklin, who took the team's starting job after being promoted from Wilkes-Barre/Scranton in Fleury's absence. Upon his return from injury, Fleury helped the Penguins win the Atlantic Division, going 10–2–1 with a 1.45 GAA en route to a 12–2 playoff run to the 2008 Stanley Cup Finals against the Detroit Red Wings. In Game 5 of the Finals at Detroit, he stopped 55 of 58 shots in a triple overtime win for the Penguins to stave off elimination. The Penguins lost the series in six games. Fleury's attempt to cover an unseen loose puck by sitting on it in Game 6 resulted in him propelling the puck into the net; the own goal turned out to be the Stanley Cup-winner, credited to Henrik Zetterberg. At the start of the following season, he said:  Fleury completed the playoffs with three shutouts – a new team record for one playoff season – and a 14–6 record. His .933 save percentage was also tops in the playoffs. In the off-season, Fleury signed a seven-year, US$35 million contract with the Penguins, on July 3. It included a no-movement clause, and a limited no-trade clause that triggered in the 2010–11 season.

2008–09
Fleury compiled a 35–18–7 record in 2008–09 to help the Penguins to a fourth-place finish in the Eastern Conference, entering the 2009 playoffs as the defending Prince of Wales champions. Fleury was a major factor in the first round against the Penguins' intrastate rivals the Philadelphia Flyers. In Game 2 at home, with a 2–1 deficit late in the third, Fleury made a key toe save against Flyers top goal scorer Jeff Carter which was eventually pivotal as the Penguins tied the game late in the 3rd and won late in overtime. After the Flyers won Game 3 comfortably, Fleury once again stole a game for the Penguins in Game 4, stopping 43 shots to keep a surging Flyers line-up at bay and ensure a 3–1 lead. The Flyers won in Pittsburgh in Game 5, but Fleury saved another performance for the final period of Game 6. After initially letting in 3 goals, Fleury did not allow another as the Penguins rallied from a 3–0 deficit to win 5–3. The Penguins went the full distance in the second round against the Washington Capitals. In the deciding game seven, Fleury made a key breakaway glove save early in the contest against Capitals superstar Alexander Ovechkin, helping the Penguins eliminate Washington by a 6–2 score.

Fleury and the Penguins then swept the Carolina Hurricanes in the Conference Finals to return to the Stanley Cup Finals against the Detroit Red Wings for the second consecutive year. After being pulled in game five after allowing 5 goals, Fleury made another momentous breakaway save in game six, this time with 1:39 minutes left in regulation against Dan Cleary to preserve a 2–1 lead and help the Penguins force a game seven. Playing the series-deciding game in Detroit, Fleury played an integral role in the Penguins 2–1 victory to capture the franchise's third Stanley Cup, making two critical saves in the final seconds. After stopping an initial Henrik Zetterberg shot from the right faceoff circle, the rebound came loose to Nicklas Lidström at the left faceoff circle, forcing Fleury to make a diving stop with 1.5 seconds remaining to preserve the win and the Stanley Cup.

2009–10
Fleury recorded a 37–21–6 record during the 2009–10 season, as the defending Stanley Cup champions Pittsburgh would again finish fourth in the Eastern Conference. After dispatching Ottawa in six games, the Penguins were upset by the eighth-seeded Montreal Canadiens in round two, ending their chance of a Stanley Cup repeat. Fleury recorded a 2.78 goals against average during the Playoffs.

2010–11

With Sidney Crosby and Evgeni Malkin sidelined with injuries for much of the 2010–11 season, Fleury and the Penguins' defence were relied on to carry the team to the playoffs. Fleury finished with a 36–20–5 record and the Penguins finished fourth in the Eastern Conference. The Penguins squared off against the Tampa Bay Lightning in the first round of the playoffs, where they were defeated in seven games despite taking a 3–1 series lead early. Fleury posted a .899 save percentage in the series.

2011–12
Backup goalies Brent Johnson and Brad Thiessen struggled through much of the 2011–12 season, leaving Fleury as the only viable goaltending option. Fleury played 67 games in the season, starting 23 consecutive games at one point leading up to the All-Star break, and finished the season with 42 wins, second only to the Nashville Predators' Pekka Rinne.

Despite the impressive regular season campaign, Fleury had a less-than-impressive playoff run, being eliminated by the Philadelphia Flyers in the first round and posting a .834 save percentage and 4.63 goals against average, as the Flyers advanced in six games.

2012–13
Fleury returned to the net after the lock-out season with a vengeance, putting some of the best marks of his career in the shortened season. He finished with a record of 23–8, tying him for fourth in the league, while his save percentage and goals against average continued to place him in the top half of starting goaltenders. His playoff troubles continued, however; after posting a shutout in his playoff game, he was less than impressive in following starts, leaving backup Tomáš Vokoun to start for the remainder of the 2013 playoffs. The Penguins promising 2012–13 season ended abruptly with a 4–0 loss to the Boston Bruins in the Eastern Conference Finals. After the season, however, Penguins officials confirmed that Fleury remained the team's starting goaltender.

2013–14

Fleury's performance during the regular season during 2013–14 was similar to his performance the year before. He finished with a record of 39–18–5 and posted a save percentage of .915 and a goals against average of 2.37. Despite a marked improvement in his playoff performance over the prior year, the Penguins lost in the second round to the New York Rangers despite taking an early 3–1 lead in the series.

2014–15
On November 5, 2014, the Penguins signed Fleury to a four-year extension with an average annual value of $5.75 million. On November 18, 2014, he earned his first shutout against the Montreal Canadiens, making 27 saves for a league-leading fourth shutout of the season, with a final score of 4–0. On November 24, 2014, Fleury recorded his 300th NHL win, becoming the third-youngest and third-fastest player to reach the milestone. On April 11, Fleury recorded his league leading tenth shutout in a 2–0 victory against the Buffalo Sabres to secure the last wild card spot in the East.

2015–16
In the 2015–16 season the team struggled through the first half, resulting in the firing of head coach Mike Johnston and the hiring of new coach Mike Sullivan. Fleury played a great second half of the season before suffering a season ending concussion. He finished the season with an impressive 35 wins in 58 games played. The team made a final push with up-and-comer Matt Murray in goal and qualified for the playoffs.
Despite the Penguins qualifying for the 2016 Stanley Cup playoffs, Fleury was unable to play due to post-concussion syndrome until Game 4 of the Eastern Conference Final against the Tampa Bay Lightning where he subbed in for Murray at the start of the third period. Fleury then started Game 5, which the Penguins lost 4–3 in overtime. Fleury was then benched in favour of Murray. The Penguins would go on to win the Stanley Cup with Murray in goal, defeating the San Jose Sharks in six games.

2016–17
In the 2016–17 season Fleury played 38 games and accumulated 18 wins. When Matt Murray was injured during warm-ups of Game 1 of the playoffs versus the Columbus Blue Jackets, Fleury took the starting position and led the Penguins to a 3–1 win. Fleury continued to lead the Penguins through the series, and his 49 saves on 51 shots in Game 5 helped the Penguins win the series against the Blue Jackets 4–1. With Murray out, Fleury continued to be the starter for the Penguins through the second round versus the Washington Capitals. The Penguins defeated the Capitals in seven games, with Fleury shutting them out in Game 7, and advanced to face the Ottawa Senators in the Eastern Conference Finals. Following a 5–1 loss in Game 3, the Penguins opted to go with a healthy Murray, who remained the team's starter en route to a Stanley Cup championship victory, defeating the Nashville Predators in six games. The win was the third Stanley Cup of Fleury's career.

Vegas Golden Knights (2017–2021)

2017–18
On June 21, 2017, with the emergence of Matt Murray, Fleury willingly waived his no trade and no movement clauses to be left exposed by the Penguins 2017 NHL Expansion Draft, where he was subsequently selected by the Vegas Golden Knights. Pittsburgh also traded their second round pick in the 2020 Entry Draft as an incentive for Vegas to select Fleury, in order for the team to be relieved of his nearly $6 million cap hit. He stopped 45 of 46 shots in the Golden Knights' first NHL game, a 2–1 victory over the Dallas Stars. On October 15, 2017, Fleury was placed on Long Term Injury Reserve (LTIR) after taking a knee to the head from Anthony Mantha of the Detroit Red Wings on October 13. He was activated off LTIR on December 10, 2017, after missing 25 games. Fleury was chosen to represent Las Vegas during the 2018 NHL All-Star Game. During the NHL All-Star Weekend, he won the inaugural Save Streak competition where he saved 14 consecutive shootout attempts. On March 12, 2018, against the Philadelphia Flyers, Fleury earned his 400th career win with a final score of 3–2.

Fleury started for the Knights during the first round of the 2018 Stanley Cup playoffs. On April 17, 2018, the Golden Knights were able to secure a 4–0 record over the Los Angeles Kings to sweep the first round of playoffs. On May 6, after Fleury posted a shutout, the Golden Knights were able to move on to the Western Conference finals by beating the San Jose Sharks in Game 6 of their playoff series. On May 20, 2018, Fleury led the Golden Knights to a victory over the Winnipeg Jets in the Western Conference Finals, which allowed Fleury to earn a shot at a fourth Stanley Cup. 
During the playoffs a Vegas casino created a chocolate sculpture showing him doing a butterfly. Fleury was in goal for each game of the Knights' five game loss to the Washington Capitals in the 2018 Stanley Cup Finals.

In the off-season, Fleury re-signed with the Knights on a three-year, $21 million contract.

2018–19
Nearly halfway through the season, Fleury played 45 games and led the NHL in wins (27) and shutouts (6). Because of his stellar play, he was again selected to represent the Golden Knights in the 2019 NHL All-Star Game for the second straight year.

In Game 7 of Las Vegas's first round playoff series against the San Jose Sharks, Fleury and the Golden Knights gave up 4 goals in 4 minutes after a controversial 5-minute major penalty was assessed to the Golden Knights because of Cody Eakin cross-checking Joe Pavelski. The Golden Knights ultimately lost Game 7 and the series to the Sharks.

2019–20
With Vegas unable to find a stable backup, Fleury was frequently overplayed during the 2019–20 season, posting a 2.77 goals against average and .905 save percentage. Vegas would eventually trade for Robin Lehner during the season, allowing Fleury to share the net as a tandem with Lehner. Fleury played sparingly during the 2020 playoffs, largely serving as Lehner's backup as the Golden Knights returned to the conference finals, losing to the Dallas Stars in five games.

2020–21
The 2020–21 season saw Fleury have a bounce back from a mediocre 2019–20 campaign. At the age of 36, Fleury recorded a career-best 1.98 goals against average and a .928 save percentage, helping the Golden Knights to their third final four appearance in four seasons. In Game 3 of the semifinals against the Montreal Canadiens, Fleury misplayed the puck behind his net, coughing up the puck to Josh Anderson who tied the game with 1:55 left in the third period. Anderson would then score the overtime winner to give the Canadiens a 2-1 series lead. As a result, Lehner started in net for the Golden Knights in Game 4, which they won in overtime to even the series at 2. Fleury returned in Game 5, but the Golden Knights lost 4-1 and the Canadiens took a 3-2 series lead, so Lehner played in Game 6 which the Canadiens won in overtime to eliminate the Golden Knights and advance to the 2021 Stanley Cup Finals. At the end of the season, Fleury was named to the Second All-Star Team, and awarded his first Vezina Trophy and first William M. Jennings Trophy.

Chicago Blackhawks (2021–2022)
On July 27, 2021, with the Golden Knights in need of salary cap space, Fleury was traded to the Chicago Blackhawks in exchange for minor league forward Mikael Hakkarainen, making Fleury the first goaltender since Dominik Hašek to be traded as the defending Vezina Trophy winner. According to both Fleury and his agent Allan Walsh, Fleury was not notified by the Golden Knights about the trade, and the two learned about it on Twitter. After being traded, Fleury reportedly contemplated retirement. However, on August 1, Fleury announced that he intended to play for the Blackhawks in the 2021–22 season.

After the team began the season with a historically poor 0–7–2 start that would ultimately lead to the sacking of coach Jeremy Colliton, Fleury recorded his first win as a Blackhawk on November 1, 2021, in a 5–1 win against the Ottawa Senators. On December 9, Fleury reached his 500th win in a shutout against the Montreal Canadiens, becoming the third goaltender in NHL history to reach the mark (after Patrick Roy and Martin Brodeur). On January 8, 2022, Fleury became the first goaltender in NHL history to beat all 32 teams in a win against the Vegas Golden Knights.

With the Blackhawks struggling and pivoting into a team rebuild, the possibility of trading Fleury became a subject of intense speculation in the leadup to the 2022 trade deadline, given his elite reputation and the impending expiration of his contract. Any such trade was complicated by a gentlemen's agreement that former Blackhawks general manager Stan Bowman had made with Fleury in convincing him not to retire, wherein he would not be traded without his consent. New general manager Kyle Davidson stated that he intended to honour that arrangement. For his part, Fleury said "If I move, I would love a chance to win. That's what I play for, and that's what I love. But it's still a big 'if' at this point."

Minnesota Wild (2022–present)
On March 21, 2022, Fleury was traded to the Minnesota Wild in exchange for a conditional 2022 second-round pick, which would become a first-round pick if the Wild reached the 2022 Western Conference Final with Fleury winning four games in the process. Bill Guerin, the general manager of the Wild, was formerly a teammate of Fleury's on the Penguins. He made his debut with the team in a March 26 game against the Columbus Blue Jackets, backstopping them to a 3–2 overtime victory. After the game a fan threw a bouquet of flowers on the ice. Fleury stated that was the first time that has ever happened.

Fleury recorded a 9–2–0 record with a .910 save percentage in 11 regular season games with the Wild. The team's other goaltender, Cam Talbot, had gone 8–0–3 with a .925 save percentage since Fleury's arrival, as a result of which there was debate as to who the team would choose to start the first round of the Stanley Cup playoffs against the St. Louis Blues. Ultimately, the nod was given to Fleury. With Fleury in net the Wild initially took a 2–1 series lead, before losing the fourth and fifth games to face elimination in Game 6. Fleury was replaced by Talbot, but the Wild were eliminated by the Blues 4 games to 2.

On July 7, 2022, Fleury opted to forgo free agency and signed a two-year, $7 million contract extension to remain with the Wild. The Wild's decision to extend Fleury caused conflict with Talbot, who was subsequently traded to the Ottawa Senators in exchange for Filip Gustavsson. On October 30, Fleury earned his 62nd shootout win and became the leader in NHL career shootout wins when the Wild defeated the Blackhawks. Gustavsson would outperform Fleury for much of the middle of the season, leading to some speculation as to who would serve as the team's starter. Fleury himself acknowledged his difficulties, assessing that he "been in my head probably too much." His play improved as the Wild headed into March, embarking on a lengthy points streak. Fleury drew headlines on March 15 for attempting to fight Blues goaltender Jordan Binnington, which the officials successfully prevented.

International play
 

Fleury won two silver medals with Team Canada at the IIHF World Junior Championships. He made his first appearance in 2003 in Halifax. Although Canada was defeated by Russia 3–2 in the gold medal game, Fleury posted a 1.57 GAA and was named the Top Goaltender and tournament MVP.

Although Fleury was playing in the NHL the next year leading up to the tournament, the Pittsburgh Penguins lent him to Team Canada. Fleury expressed a desire to remain with his NHL club, but Penguins management decided the high-profile tournament would be good for his development. He led Team Canada to the gold medal game for the second consecutive year, but made a costly mistake that lost his team the championship. With the game tied 3–3 with less than five minutes remaining in regulation, Fleury left his net to play the puck and avert a breakaway opportunity for Patrick O'Sullivan of Team USA. Fleury's clearing attempt, however, hit his own defenceman, Braydon Coburn, and trickled into the net. This proved to be the difference, as the Americans held on for a 4–3 win.

On December 30, 2009, Fleury was named to Team Canada for the 2010 Winter Olympics in Vancouver. He did not play in the tournament, however, as the goaltending duties were split between Martin Brodeur and Roberto Luongo, but still received a gold medal as Canada defeated the United States 3–2 in the final.

Personal life

Fleury was born to André and France Fleury in Sorel-Tracy, Quebec, a small town near Montreal. He has one sibling, his younger sister Marylène.

When he was first drafted, he lived with Mario Lemieux for a brief period of time as he searched for more permanent living arrangements.

Fleury married his longtime girlfriend Veronique in 2012, and the couple have two daughters and a son.

Fleury is known by the nickname "Flower", derived from the English translation of his last name (fleuri is "in bloom", or "in flower", in French). His goaltender masks always feature a fleur-de-lis on the backplate (in addition to the initials EFGT, honouring his four grandparents in memoriam), and have frequently featured some sort of flower on the front artwork as well.

Career statistics

Regular season and playoffs

International

Awards

References

External links

 
 
 
 

1984 births
Living people
Canadian expatriate ice hockey players in the United States
Canadian ice hockey goaltenders
Canadian people of French descent
Cape Breton Screaming Eagles players
Chicago Blackhawks players
French Quebecers
Ice hockey people from Pittsburgh
Ice hockey people from Quebec
Ice hockey players at the 2010 Winter Olympics
Medalists at the 2010 Winter Olympics
Minnesota Wild players
National Hockey League All-Stars
National Hockey League first-overall draft picks
National Hockey League first-round draft picks
Olympic gold medalists for Canada
Olympic ice hockey players of Canada
Olympic medalists in ice hockey
Pittsburgh Penguins draft picks
Pittsburgh Penguins players
Sportspeople from Pittsburgh
Sportspeople from Sorel-Tracy
Stanley Cup champions
Vegas Golden Knights players
Vezina Trophy winners
William M. Jennings Trophy winners
Wilkes-Barre/Scranton Penguins players